Arena Valley is an ice-free valley, between East Beacon and New Mountain, which opens to the south side of Taylor Glacier in Victoria Land. It was given this descriptive name by the Victoria University of Wellington Antarctic Expedition (VUWAE), 1958–59.

See also
Ashtray Basin

References
 

Valleys of Victoria Land
McMurdo Dry Valleys